The Safety Matches (French title: Les Allumettes suédoises), also translated under the title The Match Boy, is a novel by Robert Sabatier, published in 1969 by Albin Michel and translated into English by Patsy Southgate in 1972.

It is the first volume of an autobiographical series whose main character is a boy named Olivier.

An immediate best-seller, the book was adapted for French TV by  Jacques Ertaud in 1995.

References

1969 French novels
Novels set in Paris
French autobiographical novels
French novels adapted into television shows
Éditions Albin Michel books